Jean Luisier (15 November 1937 – 1969) was a Swiss racing cyclist. He rode in the 1961 Tour de France.

References

1937 births
1969 deaths
Swiss male cyclists